This is a list of schools in Iceland, which encompasses institutions from playschool to gymnasium.

Playschools
Playschool is non-compulsory education for those under the age of six and is the first step in the education system.

Primary schools 
Primary school is compulsory education for those aged 6 to 16 and is the second step in the education system. There were a total of 45.195 students in Icelandic primary schools in 2017.

Gymnasiums
Gymnasium is non-compulsory education for those over the age of 16 and is the third step in the education system. There are 34 gymnasiums in Iceland.

Defunct

See also
Education in Iceland
List of universities in Iceland

References

Education in Iceland
Educational organizations based in Iceland
Schools
Iceland
Iceland
Schools
Schools